Asterix at the Olympic Games is a 2008 French fantasy comedy film co–directed by Frédéric Forestier and Thomas Langmann, and written by Langmann, Alexandre Charlot and Frank Magnier, based on characters from René Goscinny and Albert Uderzo's Astérix comic series. It was filmed primarily in Spain throughout 2006. A sequel to Asterix & Obelix: Mission Cleopatra (2002), it is the third installment in the Asterix film series.

At the time of release, it was the most expensive French and non English-language film of all time. The film was negatively received by critics, but performed well at several European box offices, topping charts in Poland, Spain and France.

Plot
Astérix and Obélix must win the Olympic Games in order to help their friend Lovesix marry Princess Irina. Brutus uses every trick in the book to have his own team win the game and get rid of his father Julius Caesar in the process.

The film is loosely adapted from the original Asterix at the Olympic Games comic book. The love story subplot between Lovesix and Irina was not featured in the original story. Brutus, portrayed here as a comical villain with no relation to his depictions in Asterix comics, is the main antagonist, although he was not even featured as a character in the original comic book.

Cast

There is a cameo of Adriana Karembeu as Mrs Geriatrix and Jamel Debbouze reprises his role as Numerobis. Italian comedy actor Enrico Brignano appears as a reporter.

The film featured several cameos by real-life sports stars, most prominently by Michael Schumacher as Schumix, but also Jean Todt, Zinedine Zidane, Tony Parker and Amélie Mauresmo. The part of Roman athlete Claudius Cornedurus (Gluteus Maximus), played by Jérôme Le Banner, was originally to be played by Jean-Claude Van Damme.

Production

Filming
Filming took place in Alicante (including the Ciudad de la Luz studio), Spain and lasted six months.

Reception

Box office
The film grossed $23.4 million in France in its opening weekend, which was more than 60% of its gross in 19 territories in which the film was released. Box Office Mojo estimated $38.7 million in revenue within a week after the film was released.

References

External links
 
 

2008 films
Asterix films
Cultural depictions of Marcus Junius Brutus
Depictions of Julius Caesar on film
Films about the ancient Olympic Games
Films directed by Frédéric Forestier
Films directed by Thomas Langmann
Films produced by Thomas Langmann
Films set in ancient Greece
Films set in Greece
Films set in the 1st century BC
Films shot at Ciudad de la Luz
Films shot in Almería
French children's films
2000s French-language films
French sequel films
German children's films
Italian children's films
Italian sequel films
Pathé films
2000s French films
2000s Spanish films
2000s Italian films